Crazy Grannies is a 2021 comedic movie written by Joy Elumelu,  co-directed by Tope Alake and Kayode Peters under the production company of Elrab Entertainment.

It stars Shaffy Bello, Ngozi Nwosu, comedian Damilola Adekoya, Bolanle Ninalowo and Jimmy Odukoya.

Premiere 
The movie was premiered on Saturday, July 30, 2021 at the Victoria Island, Lagos and it was made available in Cinemas starting from August 6, 2021.

Synopsis 
The movie revolves around three funny grandmas who decided to relieve themselves of youthful stress and take a needed trip to a resort where they have the hilarious adventures of their lives.

Cast 
Bolanle Ninalowo, Jimmy Odukoya, Buchi, Bayray Mcnwizu, Kayode Peters, Chinonso Arubayi, Mercy Aigbe, Mr Macaroni, Abazie Rosemary, Jay Rammal, Marvelous Dominion, Yemi Sikola and Modella Gabriella.

References 

2021 films
2021 comedy films
Nigerian comedy films
English-language Nigerian films
2020s English-language films